Thomas or Tom Workman may refer to:

Thomas Workman (entomologist) (1844–1900), Irish entomologist and arachnologist
Thomas Workman (Canadian politician) (1813–1889), Canadian businessman and political figure
Tom Workman (basketball) (born 1944), American professional basketball player
Tom Workman (Minnesota politician) (born 1959), American politician in the state of Minnesota